Íñigo Cervantes was the defending champion but chose not to participate.

Constant Lestienne won the title after defeating Zdeněk Kolář 6–7(5–7), 6–1, 6–2 in the final.

Seeds

Draw

Finals

Top half

Bottom half

References
Main Draw
Qualifying Draw

Prosperita Open - Singles